Château d'Alba-la-Romaine is a château in Alba-la-Romaine, Ardèche, in southeast France.

The castle is listed as a Monument historique since 1939 by the French Ministry of Culture.

References

External links
 Château d'Alba 

Alba
Art museums and galleries in France
Museums in Ardèche
Historic house museums in Auvergne-Rhône-Alpes